Omineca was a provincial electoral district of the Canadian province of British Columbia. It first appeared on the hustings in the general election of 1916.

Demographics

Political Geography

Notable Elections

First Nations

Notable MLAs

Electoral history

|-

|- bgcolor="white"
!align="right" colspan=3|Total valid votes
!align="right"|761 	
!align="right"|100.00%
!align="right"|
|- bgcolor="white"
!align="right" colspan=3|Total rejected ballots
!align="right"|
!align="right"|
!align="right"|
|- bgcolor="white"
!align="right" colspan=3|Turnout
!align="right"|%
!align="right"|
!align="right"|
|}

|-

|Independent
|Alexander James Prudhomme
|align="right"|78 	
|align="right"|7.54%
|align="right"|
|align="right"|unknown

|Independent
|Joseph S. Kelly
|align="right"|54
|align="right"|5.22%
|align="right"|
|align="right"|unknown
|- bgcolor="white"
!align="right" colspan=3|Total valid votes
!align="right"|1,035 	
!align="right"|100.00%
!align="right"|
|- bgcolor="white"
!align="right" colspan=3|Total rejected ballots
!align="right"|
!align="right"|
!align="right"|
|- bgcolor="white"
!align="right" colspan=3|Turnout
!align="right"|%
!align="right"|
!align="right"|
|}

|-
 
|Liberal
|Alexander Malcolm Manson
|align="right"|592
|align="right"|44.08%
|align="right"|
|align="right"|unknown

|- bgcolor="white"
!align="right" colspan=3|Total valid votes
!align="right"|1,343 
!align="right"|100.00%
!align="right"|
|- bgcolor="white"
!align="right" colspan=3|Total rejected ballots
!align="right"|
!align="right"|
!align="right"|
|- bgcolor="white"
!align="right" colspan=3|Turnout
!align="right"|%
!align="right"|
!align="right"|
|}

|-
 
|Liberal
|Alexander Malcolm Manson
|align="right"|889
|align="right"|57.21%
|align="right"|
|align="right"|unknown

|- bgcolor="white"
!align="right" colspan=3|Total valid votes
!align="right"|1,554 
!align="right"|100.00%
!align="right"|
|- bgcolor="white"
!align="right" colspan=3|Total rejected ballots
!align="right"|20
!align="right"|
!align="right"|
|- bgcolor="white"
!align="right" colspan=3|Turnout
!align="right"|%
!align="right"|
!align="right"|
|}

|-
 
|Liberal
|Alexander Malcolm Manson
|align="right"|1,079
|align="right"|52.23%
|align="right"|
|align="right"|unknown
 
|Co-operative Commonwealth Fed.
|Arthur Edward Windle
|align="right"|538 	
|align="right"|26.04%
|align="right"|
|align="right"|unknown

|Independent
|Louis Denison Taylor
|align="right"|94
|align="right"|4.55%
|align="right"|
|align="right"|unknown
|- bgcolor="white"
!align="right" colspan=3|Total valid votes
!align="right"|2,066 	
!align="right"|100.00%
!align="right"|
|- bgcolor="white"
!align="right" colspan=3|Total rejected ballots
!align="right"|35
!align="right"|
!align="right"|
|- bgcolor="white"
!align="right" colspan=3|Turnout
!align="right"|%
!align="right"|
!align="right"|
|}

|-
 
|Liberal
|Mark Matthew Connelly
|align="right"|899 	
|align="right"|48.75%
|align="right"|
|align="right"|unknown
 
|Co-operative Commonwealth Fed.
|Sidney Godwin
|align="right"|697 	
|align="right"|37.80%
|align="right"|
|align="right"|unknown

|- bgcolor="white"
!align="right" colspan=3|Total valid votes
!align="right"|1,844 
!align="right"|100.00%
!align="right"|
|- bgcolor="white"
!align="right" colspan=3|Total rejected ballots
!align="right"|
!align="right"|
!align="right"|
|- bgcolor="white"
!align="right" colspan=3|Turnout
!align="right"|%
!align="right"|
!align="right"|
|}
Reason for by-election: Resignation of A. M. Manson on September 14, 1935 to contest federal election (Vancouver South, October 14, 1935).

|-
 
|Liberal
|Mark Matthew Connelly
|align="right"|1,013 	
|align="right"|50.90%
|align="right"|
|align="right"|unknown
 
|Co-operative Commonwealth Fed.
|Sidney Godwin
|align="right"|783 	
|align="right"|39.35%
|align="right"|
|align="right"|unknown

|- bgcolor="white"
!align="right" colspan=3|Total valid votes
!align="right"|1,990 
!align="right"|100.00%
!align="right"|
|- bgcolor="white"
!align="right" colspan=3|Total rejected ballots
!align="right"|37
!align="right"|
!align="right"|
|- bgcolor="white"
!align="right" colspan=3|Turnout
!align="right"|%
!align="right"|
!align="right"|
|}

|-
 
|Liberal
|Mark Matthew Connelly
|align="right"|839
|align="right"|49.50%
|align="right"|
|align="right"|unknown
 
|Co-operative Commonwealth Fed.
|William David Menzies
|align="right"|554
|align="right"|32.68%
|align="right"|
|align="right"|unknown

|- bgcolor="white"
!align="right" colspan=3|Total valid votes
!align="right"|1,695 	
!align="right"|100.00%
!align="right"|
|- bgcolor="white"
!align="right" colspan=3|Total rejected ballots
!align="right"|48
!align="right"|
!align="right"|
|- bgcolor="white"
!align="right" colspan=3|Turnout
!align="right"|%
!align="right"|
!align="right"|
|}

|-
 
|Co-operative Commonwealth Fed.
|Edward Fraser Rowland
|align="right"|932 	
|align="right"|51.58%
|align="right"|
|align="right"|unknown

|- bgcolor="white"
!align="right" colspan=3|Total valid votes
!align="right"|1,807 
!align="right"|100.00%
!align="right"|
|- bgcolor="white"
!align="right" colspan=3|Total rejected ballots
!align="right"|36
!align="right"|
!align="right"|
|- bgcolor="white"
!align="right" colspan=3|Turnout
!align="right"|%
!align="right"|
!align="right"|
|}

|-

 
|Co-operative Commonwealth Fed.
|Edward Fraser Rowland
|align="right"|1,175
|align="right"|38.40%
|align="right"|
|align="right"|unknown
|- bgcolor="white"
!align="right" colspan=3|Total valid votes
!align="right"|3,060 
!align="right"|100.00%
!align="right"|
|- bgcolor="white"
!align="right" colspan=3|Total rejected ballots
!align="right"|83
!align="right"|
!align="right"|
|- bgcolor="white"
!align="right" colspan=3|Turnout
!align="right"|%
!align="right"|
!align="right"|
|}

|-

|Liberal
|Robert Cecil Steele
|align="right"|1,099 
|align="right"|30.13% 
|align="right"|1,437
|align="right"|47.21% 
|align="right"|

|Co-operative Commonwealth Fed.
|Warden Randle Taylor
|align="right"|838 
|align="right"|22.97%
|align="right"|-
|align="right"| - %
|align="right"|

|Progressive Conservative
|George Ogston
|align="right"|574 
|align="right"|15.73%
|align="right"|-- 
|align="right"|--.--%
|align="right"|
|- bgcolor="white"
!align="right" colspan=3|Total valid votes
!align="right"|3,648
!align="right"|100.00%
!align="right"|3,044 
!align="right"|%
!align="right"|
|- bgcolor="white"
!align="right" colspan=3|Total rejected ballots
!align="right"|132
!align="right"|
!align="right"|
|- bgcolor="white"
!align="right" colspan=3|Turnout
!align="right"|%
!align="right"|
!align="right"|
|- bgcolor="white"
!align="right" colspan=9|1(Preferential ballot: 1st and 3rd counts of three shown only) 	
|}

|-

|Liberal
|Robert Cecil Steele
|align="right"|1,145 	 	 		 	
|align="right"|31.29% 
|align="right"|1,379
|align="right"|46.10% 
|align="right"|

|Co-operative Commonwealth Fed.
|Edward Fraser Rowland
|align="right"|952 	 	 
|align="right"|26.02%
|align="right"| - 
|align="right"| - %
|align="right"|

|Progressive Conservative
|Samuel Williams Cocker
|align="right"|172
|align="right"|4.70%
|align="right"|-- 
|align="right"|--.--%
|align="right"|
|- bgcolor="white"
!align="right" colspan=3|Total valid votes
!align="right"|3,659 	 	 
!align="right"|100.00%
!align="right"|2,991 	 
!align="right"|%
!align="right"|
|- bgcolor="white"
!align="right" colspan=3|Total rejected ballots
!align="right"|175
!align="right"|
!align="right"|
|- bgcolor="white"
!align="right" colspan=3|Turnout
!align="right"|%
!align="right"|
!align="right"|
|- bgcolor="white"
!align="right" colspan=9|2Preferential ballot: 1st and 3rd counts of Three shown only) 	
|}

|-

 
|Liberal
|Joseph Norman Leslie
|align="right"|847
|align="right"|27.17%
|align="right"|
|align="right"|unknown
 
|Co-operative Commonwealth Fed.
|George Johnson McInnis
|align="right"|585
|align="right"|18.77%
|align="right"|
|align="right"|unknown
|- bgcolor="white"
!align="right" colspan=3|Total valid votes
!align="right"|3,117 
!align="right"|100.00%
!align="right"|
|- bgcolor="white"
!align="right" colspan=3|Total rejected ballots
!align="right"|52
!align="right"|
!align="right"|
|- bgcolor="white"
!align="right" colspan=3|Turnout
!align="right"|%
!align="right"|
!align="right"|
|}

|-

 
|Co-operative Commonwealth Fed.
|Ivan Everett Holmes
|align="right"|1,119 	
|align="right"|31.44%
|align="right"|
|align="right"|unknown
 
|Liberal
|Marguerite Clarice Deeder
|align="right"|529
|align="right"|14.86%
|align="right"|
|align="right"|unknown
 
|Progressive Conservative
|Karl Peter Frederiksen
|align="right"|278
|align="right"|7.81%
|align="right"|
|align="right"|unknown
|- bgcolor="white"
!align="right" colspan=3|Total valid votes
!align="right"|3,559 	
!align="right"|100.00%
!align="right"|
|- bgcolor="white"
!align="right" colspan=3|Total rejected ballots
!align="right"|64
!align="right"|
!align="right"|
|- bgcolor="white"
!align="right" colspan=3|Turnout
!align="right"|%
!align="right"|
!align="right"|
|}

|-

 
|New Democrat
|Robert Fred Langford
|align="right"|779
|align="right"|22.17%
|align="right"|
|align="right"|unknown
 
|Liberal
|Richard M. McCallum
|align="right"|528
|align="right"|15.03%
|align="right"|
|align="right"|unknown
 
|Progressive Conservative
|Philip Pickering
|align="right"|271
|align="right"|7.71%
|align="right"|
|align="right"|unknown
|- bgcolor="white"
!align="right" colspan=3|Total valid votes
!align="right"|3,514 	
!align="right"|100.00%
!align="right"|
|- bgcolor="white"
!align="right" colspan=3|Total rejected ballots
!align="right"|51
!align="right"|
!align="right"|
|- bgcolor="white"
!align="right" colspan=3|Turnout
!align="right"|%
!align="right"|
!align="right"|
|}

|-

 
|New Democrat
|Cornelius Bergen
|align="right"|994 	
|align="right"|29.84%
|align="right"|
|align="right"|unknown
|- bgcolor="white"
!align="right" colspan=3|Total valid votes
!align="right"|3,331 
!align="right"|100.00%
!align="right"|
|- bgcolor="white"
!align="right" colspan=3|Total rejected ballots
!align="right"|172
!align="right"|
!align="right"|
|- bgcolor="white"
!align="right" colspan=3|Turnout
!align="right"|%
!align="right"|
!align="right"|
|}

|-

 
|New Democrat
|Douglas Tynwald Kelly
|align="right"|1,607 	
|align="right"|30.14%
|align="right"|
|align="right"|unknown
 
|Liberal
|Michael Chunys
|align="right"|472 	
|align="right"|8.85%
|align="right"|
|align="right"|unknown
|- bgcolor="white"
!align="right" colspan=3|Total valid votes
!align="right"|5,331 	
!align="right"|100.00%
!align="right"|
|- bgcolor="white"
!align="right" colspan=3|Total rejected ballots
!align="right"|72
!align="right"|
!align="right"|
|- bgcolor="white"
!align="right" colspan=3|Turnout
!align="right"|%
!align="right"|
!align="right"|
|}

|-
 
|New Democrat
|Douglas Tynwald Kelly
|align="right"|2,600 	
|align="right"|39.68%
|align="right"|
|align="right"|unknown

 
|Progressive Conservative
|Charles Irving Beck
|align="right"|1,018 	
|align="right"|15.53%
|align="right"|
|align="right"|unknown
 
|Liberal
|Darrell Frederick Cursons
|align="right"|517 	
|align="right"|7.89%
|align="right"|
|align="right"|unknown
|- bgcolor="white"
!align="right" colspan=3|Total valid votes
!align="right"|6,553 
!align="right"|100.00%
!align="right"|
|- bgcolor="white"
!align="right" colspan=3|Total rejected ballots
!align="right"|101
!align="right"|
!align="right"|
|- bgcolor="white"
!align="right" colspan=3|Turnout
!align="right"|%
!align="right"|
!align="right"|
|}

|-

 
|New Democrat
|Douglas Tynwald Kelly
|align="right"|2,776 	
|align="right"|30.82%
|align="right"|
|align="right"|unknown
 
|Liberal
|Basil Edward Studer
|align="right"|1,003 	
|align="right"|11.14%
|align="right"|
|align="right"|unknown
|- bgcolor="white"
!align="right" colspan=3|Total valid votes
!align="right"|9,007 
!align="right"|100.00%
!align="right"|
|- bgcolor="white"
!align="right" colspan=3|Total rejected ballots
!align="right"|111
!align="right"|
!align="right"|
|- bgcolor="white"
!align="right" colspan=3|Turnout
!align="right"|%
!align="right"|
!align="right"|
|}

|-

 
|New Democrat
|Russell Frederick Anderson
|align="right"|4,163
|align="right"|41.66%
|align="right"|
|align="right"|unknown
|- bgcolor="white"
!align="right" colspan=3|Total valid votes
!align="right"|9,993
!align="right"|100.00%
!align="right"|
|- bgcolor="white"
!align="right" colspan=3|Total rejected ballots
!align="right"|199
!align="right"|
!align="right"|
|- bgcolor="white"
!align="right" colspan=3|Turnout
!align="right"|%
!align="right"|
!align="right"|
|}

|-

 
|New Democrat
|Bruce Thomas Kanary
|align="right"|4,164
|align="right"|34.54%
|align="right"|
|align="right"|unknown

 
|Liberal
|David Anthony Seiler
|align="right"|162 	
|align="right"|1.34%
|align="right"|
|align="right"|unknown
|- bgcolor="white"
!align="right" colspan=3|Total valid votes
!align="right"|12,054 	
!align="right"|100.00%
!align="right"|
|- bgcolor="white"
!align="right" colspan=3|Total rejected ballots
!align="right"|168
!align="right"|
!align="right"|
|- bgcolor="white"
!align="right" colspan=3|Turnout
!align="right"|%
!align="right"|
!align="right"|
|}

|-

 
|New Democrat
|Louise B. Kilby
|align="right"|4,295 	
|align="right"|39.47%
|align="right"|
|align="right"|unknown
|- bgcolor="white"
!align="right" colspan=3|Total valid votes
!align="right"|10,881 
!align="right"|100.00%
!align="right"|
|- bgcolor="white"
!align="right" colspan=3|Total rejected ballots
!align="right"|154
!align="right"|
!align="right"|
|- bgcolor="white"
!align="right" colspan=3|Turnout
!align="right"|%
!align="right"|
!align="right"|
|}

Sources
Elections BC historical returns

Former provincial electoral districts of British Columbia